Jelle Zijlstra (27 August 1918 – 23 December 2001) was a Dutch politician of the defunct Anti-Revolutionary Party (ARP) now the Christian Democratic Appeal (CDA) party and economist who served as Prime Minister of the Netherlands from 22 November 1966 until 5 April 1967.

Zijlstra studied Economics at the Rotterdam School of Economics obtaining a Master of Economics degree and worked as a researcher and lecturer at his alma mater before finishing his thesis and graduated as a Doctor of Philosophy in Public economics and worked as a professor of Public economics at the Free University Amsterdam from October 1948 until September 1952. After the election of 1952 Zijlstra was appointed as Minister of Economic Affairs in the Cabinet Drees II taking office on 2 September 1952. After Party Leader Jan Schouten announced his retirement Zijlstra was selected his successor as Leader on 23 April 1956. For the election of 1956 Zijlstra served as Lijsttrekker (top candidate) and was elected as a Member of the House of Representatives and Parliamentary leader taking office on 3 July 1956. Following a cabinet formation Zijlstra continued as Minister of Economic Affairs in the Cabinet Drees III and stepped down as Leader and Parliamentary leader on 3 October 1956. The Cabinet Drees III fell on 11 December 1958 and was replaced by the caretaker Cabinet Beel II with Zijlstra retaining his position and also becoming Minister of Finance taking office on 22 December 1958. For the election of 1959 Zijlstra again served as Lijsttrekker. Following a cabinet formation Zijlstra continued as Minister of Finance in the Cabinet De Quay. In September 1962 Zijlstra announced that he wouldn't not stand for the election of 1963 and declined to serve in new cabinet. Zijlstra returned as a distinguished professor of Public economics at the Free University Amsterdam and was elected as a Member of the Senate after the Senate election of 1963 taking office on 25 June 1963 serving as a frontbencher and spokesperson for Finance. Zijlstra also served as director of the Abraham Kuyper Foundation from August 1963 until November 1966. 

Zijlstra continued to be active in politics and in September 1966 was nominated as the next President of the Central Bank. However, after a political crisis, he was persuaded to lead an interim cabinet until the next election. Zijlstra formed the caretaker Cabinet Zijlstra and became Prime Minister of the Netherlands and dual served as Minister of Finances taking office on 22 November 1966. Before the election of 1967 Zijlstra indicated that he wouldn't serve another term as Prime Minister and opted to accepted the nomination as head of the Central Bank. Zijlstra left office following the installation of the Cabinet De Jong on 5 April 1967 and was confirmed as chief of the Central Bank serving from 1 May 1967 until 1 January 1982.

Zijlstra retired from active politics at 63 and became active in the private and public sectors as a corporate and non-profit director and served on several state commissions and councils on behalf of the government, and continued to be active in advocating for a balanced governmental budget. Zijlstra was known for his abilities as skillful manager and effective Debater. Zijlstra was granted the honorary title of Minister of State on 30 April 1983 and continued to comment on political affairs as a statesman until his death from dementia-related illness at the age of 83. He holds the distinction as the shortest-serving Prime Minister after World War II and his premiership is therefore is usually omitted both by scholars and the public in rankings but his legacy as a Minister in the 1950s and 60s and later as President of the Central Bank continue to this-day.

Biography

Early life
Jelle Zijlstra was born on 27 August 1918 in Oosterbierum in the province of Friesland in a Reformed family, the son of Ane Jelle Zijlstra (born 14 November 1879) and Pietje Postuma (born 6 March 1897), both of which had also been born in the village. After completing his secondary education he studied at the Netherlands School of Economics, the predecessor of the Erasmus University Rotterdam. His studies were interrupted twice: first by his period of military service and later when he had to go into hiding in 1942 after refusing to sign the loyalty oath required of students by the Nazi occupation authorities. Even so, he completed his economics degree in October 1945 as a Master of Economics.

Immediately after graduating, Zijlstra became a research assistant at the Netherlands School of Economics and was promoted a year later to senior research assistant and in 1947 to lecturer. In 1948 he was awarded a doctorate as a Doctor of Philosophy with cum laude for his thesis on the rate of circulation of money and its bearing on the value of money and monetary equilibrium. In the same year he was appointed professor of economics at the Vrije Universiteit.

Politics
Representing the Anti-Revolutionary Party, Zijlstra successively served as Minister of Economic Affairs in the Drees II, Drees III and Beel II cabinets, and as Minister of Finance in the Beel II and De Quay cabinets between 2 September 1952 and 24 July 1963.

Following his ministerial career, Zijlstra returned to the Vrije Universiteit as professor of public finance, though he also served between 1963 and 1966 as a member of the Senate. In 1973 Zijlstra became member of the Royal Netherlands Academy of Arts and Sciences. After the fall of the Cabinet Cals, Zijlstra headed an interim government as Prime Minister of the Netherlands and Minister of Finance between 22 November 1966 until 5 April 1967.

From 1967 until the end of 1981 he was President of De Nederlandsche Bank, the central bank of the Netherlands, and in the course of that period he was also President of the Bank for International Settlements in Basel. He has sat on many boards in the public and private sectors.

Personal
On 11 March 1946 Zijlstra married his childhood sweetheart Hetty Bloksma (30 January 1921 – 19 November 2013). They had three daughters and two sons, who were born between 1947 and 1961. The last months of life were dominated by his deteriorating health, and he suffered from dementia. Jelle Zijlstra died in Wassenaar on 23 December 2001 at the age of eighty-three Zijlstra, and was buried at the cemetery of the local Reformed Church in Wassenaar. His younger brother Rinse Zijlstra (19 April 1927 – 26 September 2017) was also a member of the House of Representatives, serving from 23 February 1967 until 10 May 1971 and a Senator serving from 12 April 1983 until 13 June 1995 for the Anti-Revolutionary Party and the Christian Democratic Appeal.

Decorations

References

External links

Official
  Dr. J. (Jelle) Zijlstra Parlement & Politiek
  Dr. J. Zijlstra (ARP) Eerste Kamer der Staten-Generaal
  Kabinet-Zijlstra Rijksoverheid

 

1918 births
2001 deaths
Anti-Revolutionary Party politicians
Businesspeople from Amsterdam
Christian Democratic Appeal politicians
Deaths from dementia in the Netherlands
Dutch bankers
Dutch business writers
Dutch chief executives in the finance industry
Dutch corporate directors
Dutch financial writers
Dutch nonprofit directors
Dutch nonprofit executives
Erasmus University Rotterdam alumni
Academic staff of Erasmus University Rotterdam
Financial economists
Grand Crosses of the Order of the Crown (Belgium)
Grand Crosses of the Order of the House of Orange
Knights Grand Cross of the Order of Orange-Nassau
Leaders of the Anti-Revolutionary Party
Macroeconomists
Members of the House of Representatives (Netherlands)
Members of the Royal Netherlands Academy of Arts and Sciences
Members of the Senate (Netherlands)
Members of the Social and Economic Council
Ministers of Economic Affairs of the Netherlands
Ministers of Finance of the Netherlands
Ministers of State (Netherlands)
Monetarists
Monetary economists
Politicians from Amsterdam
People from Franekeradeel
People from Wassenaar
Presidents of the Central Bank of the Netherlands
Political economists
Prime Ministers of the Netherlands
Public economists
Royal Netherlands Army officers
Royal Netherlands Army personnel of World War II
Recipients of the Grand Decoration with Sash for Services to the Republic of Austria
Reformed Churches Christians from the Netherlands
Academic staff of Vrije Universiteit Amsterdam
Writers from Amsterdam
20th-century Dutch businesspeople
20th-century Dutch economists
20th-century Dutch male writers
20th-century Dutch politicians